Labbay (Labbai, Labba, Labbabeen, Lebbay, Lebbai), is an Muslim trading community in southern India found throughout the southern Indian states of Tamil Nadu, Karnataka and Kerala.

Etymology 
Labbay means "Here I am", and is used as a title for Tamil-speaking Muslims who are converts to Islam.

History 
Before the arrival of the Dutch in the region, the Muslim traders and Muslim boat-makers were part of the same community. They both claimed to descend from Arabs and intermarried with Hindus. When the Dutch arrived, the Muslim traders stopped intermarrying with Hindus, and allowed their women to be taken as concubines by the Dutch. The traders, who now called Labbay, used their title to claim that they "rediscovered" their Arab ancestry and claim nobility. While in some regions the title "Labbay" carried a stigma due to it being held by converts, the Labbay traders were able to change its meaning into a title of social and religious superiority.

Since the Labbay traders were the only literate Muslims in the region, they became priests, registrars, and commentators of the Quran. Their role as priests gave them high-status in the Muslim community, and great wealth in their role as traders. They spoke Tamil, but wrote it in Arabic script. They prohibited intermarriages and common funeral grounds between them and other Muslim communities.

References

See also. 
Tamil Muslim

Muslim communities of India
Indian surnames
Indian castes
Social groups of Tamil Nadu